Sport Northern Ireland is the regional government sports council (funding body) for Northern Ireland.

History

It was established under the Recreation and Youth Service (Northern Ireland) Order 1973 as the Sports Council for Northern Ireland, with its purpose defined by Article 3 of the Recreation and Youth Service (Northern Ireland) Order 1986. Another organisation, the Youth and Sports Council for Northern Ireland, had been established by the Youth Welfare, Physical Training and Recreation Act of 1962.

From 2006, it organised Northern Ireland's involvement in the UK School Games.

It has recently contributed £7m to the building of Northern Ireland's first 50m swimming pool, for North Down Borough Council, approved in September 2009, being built by Farrans (Construction) (owned by CRH plc).

Structure

Its head office is based at the Malone Roundabout of the A55 and B103, near Barnett Demesne.

Funding
It receives around £7m a year from the National Lottery; the rest comes from the taxpayer.

Centres
It has a national outdoor training centre, the Tollymore National Outdoor Centre, at the base of the Mourne Mountains. This is a training base for mountaineering and canoeing. It was built in 1970.

At the Jordanstown campus of Ulster University, it has the Sports Institute for Northern Ireland. This was created in 2002.

See also
 Sport Ireland, similar organisation for the Republic of Ireland
 Northern Ireland at the Commonwealth Games
 Northern Ireland Federation of Sub-Aqua Clubs

References

External links
 Sport Northern Ireland
 Sport NI at Flickr
 Sports Institute Northern Ireland
 Tollymore National Outdoor Centre

Video clips
 Sport NI YouTube channel
 Tollymore NOC YouTube channel

1973 establishments in Northern Ireland
Government agencies established in 1973
Organisations based in Belfast
Physical education in the United Kingdom
Non-Departmental Public Bodies of the Northern Ireland Executive